Roger Altham was Archdeacon of Middlesex from 9 February 1717 until his death on 27 February 1730.

Altham was born in Eastwick, Hertfordshire and educated at Christ Church, Oxford.  He was Rector of St Andrew Undershaft with St Mary Axe; then of St Botolph, Bishopsgate; and finally of St Mary the Virgin, Latton, Essex. He was buried in the chancel  at Latton.

Notes

18th-century English Anglican priests
Alumni of Christ Church, Oxford
Archdeacons of Middlesex
Church of St Mary the Virgin, Harlow
1730 deaths
Latton, Essex